In English folklore, Black Shuck, Old Shuck, Old Shock or simply Shuck is the name given to a ghostly black dog which is said to roam the coastline and countryside of East Anglia, one of many such black dogs recorded in folklore across the British Isles. Accounts of Black Shuck form part of the folklore of Norfolk, Suffolk, the Cambridgeshire Fens and Essex, and descriptions of the creature's appearance and nature vary considerably; it is sometimes recorded as an omen of death, but, in other instances, is described as companionable.

According to the Oxford English Dictionary, the name Shuck derives from the Old English word  'devil, fiend', perhaps from the root  'to terrify'. The first mention in print of "Black Shuck" is by Reverend E. S. Taylor in an 1850 edition of the journal Notes and Queries which describes "Shuck the Dog-fiend"; "This phantom I have heard many persons in East Norfolk, and even Cambridgeshire, describe as having seen as a black shaggy dog, with fiery eyes and of immense size, and who visits churchyards at midnight."

Abraham Fleming's account of the appearance of A strange, and terrible wunder in 1577 at Bungay, Suffolk is a famous account of the beast. Images of sinister black dogs have become part of the iconography of the area and have appeared in popular culture. Writing in 1877, Walter Rye stated that Shuck was "the most curious of our local apparitions, as they are no doubt varieties of the same animal."

Descriptions 
Descriptions of Black Shuck vary in both shape and size, from that of a large dog to being the size of a calf or horse. W. A. Dutt, in his 1901 Highways & Byways in East Anglia describes the creature thus:

Dr Simon Sherwood suggests that the earliest surviving description of devilish black hounds is an account of an incident in the Peterborough Abbey recorded in the Peterborough Chronicle (one version of the Anglo-Saxon Chronicle) around 1127:

This account also appears to describe the Europe-wide phenomenon of a Wild Hunt.

Bungay and Blythburgh 

One of the most notable reports of Black Shuck is of his appearance at the churches of Bungay and Blythburgh in Suffolk. On 4 August 1577, at Blythburgh, Black Shuck is said to have burst in through the doors of Holy Trinity Church to a clap of thunder. He ran up the nave, past a large congregation, killing a man and boy and causing the church steeple to collapse through the roof. As the dog left, he left scorch marks on the north door which can be seen at the church to this day.

The encounter on the same day at St Mary's Church, Bungay was described in A Straunge and Terrible Wunder by Abraham Fleming in 1577:

Fleming was a translator and editor for several printing houses in London, and therefore probably only published his account based on exaggerated oral accounts. Other local accounts attribute the event to the Devil (Fleming calls the animal "the Divel in such a likeness"). The scorch marks on the door are referred to by the locals as "the devil’s fingerprints", and the event is remembered in this verse:

Dr David Waldron and Christopher Reeve suggest that a fierce electrical storm recorded by contemporary accounts on that date, coupled with the trauma of the ongoing Reformation, may have led to the accounts entering folklore.

Littleport 

Littleport, Cambridgeshire is home to two different legends of spectral black dogs, which have been linked to the Black Shuck folklore, but differ in significant aspects: local folklorist W.H. Barrett relates the story of a huge black dog haunting the area after being killed rescuing a local girl from a lustful friar in pre-reformation times, while fellow folklorist Enid Porter relates stories of a black dog haunting the A10 road after its owner drowned in the nearby River Great Ouse in the 1800s.

In popular culture 
British rock band The Darkness have a song called "Black Shuck" on their 2003 debut album Permission to Land.

In Teen Wolf, an ancient Hellhound spirit that had possessed someone, tells one of the main characters that it is known by many names, one of which is "Black Shuck".

British rock band Down I Go have a song called "Black Shuck" on their 2019 EP 'All Down the Church in Midst of Fire the Hellish Monster Flew, and Passing Onward to the Quire, He Many People Slew'.

In June 2019, after being previously crowdfunded on Kickstarter, the graphic novel The Burning Black: Legend of Black Shuck was published by Renegade Arts Entertainment. The book was written by Mark Allard-Will, with artwork by Ryan Howe and lettering by Elaine M. Will. The graphic novel features Black Shuck as its central antagonist.

The Black Shuck appears in the 2020 video game Assassin's Creed: Valhalla as a mini boss encountered while exploring the countryside of East Anglia. The player can find it eating a carcass amidst a ruined building, and when killed it gives the player a skill point and its decapitated head.

The Black Shuck appears in Rahel Kapsaski's 2020 stop-motion animated folk horror film Curse of the Black Shuck released by Troma.

Black Shuck is a track with 'knot-in-the-stomach insistent strings' on These Feral Lands Volume 1, a 2020 release by musician Laura Cannell, comedian Stewart Lee and others.

Satirical, comedic, theatrical string quartet Bowjangles feature a song about Black Shuck composed by Norfolk-born ensemble member Bertie Anderson in the recording of their stage show Excalibow, in keeping with the overall theme of myths and legends.

See also 
 Barghest
 Black dog (ghost)
 Black dog ghosts in popular culture
 Shug Monkey

References 

English legendary creatures
Mythological dogs
Mythological canines
Cambridgeshire folklore
Essex folklore
Lincolnshire folklore
Norfolk folklore
Suffolk folklore
Suffolk Coastal